Plaza Las Delicias is the main plaza in the city of Ponce, Puerto Rico.  The square is notable for its fountains and for the various monuments it contains. The historic Parque de Bombas and Ponce Cathedral buildings are located within the plaza, which actually consists of two squares: Plaza Muñoz Rivera on the north end, and Plaza Degetau on the southern end. The square is the center of the Ponce Historic Zone, and it is flanked by the historic Ponce City Hall to the south, the early 19th-century Teatro Fox Delicias to the north, the NRHP-listed Banco Crédito y Ahorro Ponceño and Banco de Ponce buildings to the east, and the Armstrong-Poventud Residence to the west. The square dates back to the early Spanish settlement in Ponce of 1670. It is the main tourist attraction of the city, receiving about a quarter of a million visitors per year.

History

According to the traditional Spanish colonial custom, a town's main square, or plaza, was the center of the town. In the case of Ponce, a Catholic church was built on the center of the plaza, thus splitting the plaza into two sections. The Plaza Las Delicias square is, thus, actually made up of two plazas.  The north section of the square is named Plaza Luis Muñoz Rivera (Luis Muñoz Rivera square), while the south section is called Plaza Federico Degetau (Federico Degetau square). Plaza Las Delicias measures 8,800 square meters.

The history of Plaza Las Delicias dates back to as far as the creation of the first Catholic chapel in Ponce in 1670.  It is also known that around 1840 Mayor Salvador de Vives planted trees as a renovation project for Plaza Las Delicias. It was first lit in 1864.

In addition to the cathedral and the firehouse, Plaza Las Delicias at one point also contained an open dining Moorish-style Arab kiosk that had been part of the 1882 Fair Exposition.  The kiosk was still present at the time of the American invasion of the island in 1898 as reported by American photo-journalist William Dinwiddie, but it was demolished in 1914.

Plaza Luis Muñoz Rivera

Plaza Luis Muñoz Rivera is the smaller of the two plazas. It is situated to the north of the Ponce Cathedral, and was originally known as Paseo de La Alameda, and was at a time also called "Plaza Las Delicias" itself, but today it is known as Plaza Luis Muñoz Rivera.  It is so named to honor the prominent poet, journalist, and politician by that name born in Barranquitas and whose statue stands prominently in the center of this plaza. The statue is the product of the foundry of Italian sculptor Luiggi Tomassi. in Pietrasanta, Italy. The Muñoz Rivera statue is made in bronze and was unveiled in 1923. Luis Yordán Dávila, mayor of Ponce at the time, was one of the main proponents of the monument. In addition to the statue of Munoz Rivera, this section of Plaza Las Delicias also has two fountains.

Plaza Muñoz Rivera is bounded on the north by Plaza Muñoz Rivera street (also called Reina street and Isabel street), on the west by Union street, on the east by Atocha street, and on the south by the Ponce Cathedral and Parque de Bombas. Two hotels, various banks, several boutiques, a five-story drugstore building (now home to the Pontifical Catholic University of Puerto Rico School of Architecture), and the historic Fox Delicias theater surround this smaller plaza.

Plaza Federico Degetau

Plaza Federico Degetau is the larger of the two plazas. It was designed by architect Francisco Porrata-Doria in 1914. It is located south of the cathedral and the firehouse. It was originally called Antigua Plaza Real (Old Royal Plaza).  This section of Plaza Las Delicias is perhaps the best known and the one most often seen in pictures.

In the center of this plaza lies the famous Fuente de los Leones (Lions Fountain). The large, round-shaped fountain is bounded by a low, marmol and granite wall. The fountain's wall boundary is shaped in the form of a regular octagon and built so that one of the vertices of the octagon points towards the historic Ponce City Hall.  The fountain also features four lion statues and water that flows under colored lighting effects.  The four lion statues are located one statue on each alternating vertex of the fountain's octagonal boundary wall.  The fountain was purchased in 1939 at the New York World's Fair.  The fountain, including a mechanical basement, was remodeled and restored in 1993. Its base was enlarged and a computerized lighting system was installed.

This plaza also features a statue of native composer, Juan Morel Campos. This statue was also produced at the workshop of Italian sculptor Luiggi Tomassi Also in this plaza is an obelisk in honor of the firefighters that fought in the "Polvorín" fire (See Monumento a los heroes de El Polvorín). The obelisk was unveiled in 1948, in time for the 50th anniversary of the frightful fire. There is also a statue, called Blind Justice of a woman on a long dress with her eyes covered by a cloth wrapped around the top of her head. The woman's left hand holds a sword inside a shaft resting on the ground and there are two children sitting happily by her feet: one is embracing the lower part of the shaft, the other is playing with an orange tree branch.

Plaza Degetau is bounded on the north by the Our Lady of Guadalupe Cathedral and Parque de Bombas, on the south by Plaza Degetau street (also called Villa street and Comercio street), on the west by Union street, and on the east by Atocha street. It is surrounded by two hotels, the Ponce City Hall, two banks (historic Banco de Ponce and historic Banco Crédito), a long-standing ice cream parlor called "King's Cream", and various boutiques and cafes.

Setting
The Plaza has wide mosaic-tile sidewalks, well-manicured flower gardens, well-trimmed bushes and Indian laurel trees, late 1800s lampposts, and numerous marble benches. It is home to the Lions Fountain, "one of the most beautiful fountains in Puerto Rico."  The fountain is made of marble and bronze.

It is surrounded by a multitude of historic sites: Paseo Atocha, Old Fox Delicias Theater, and Callejon Amor (Love Alley), among others. During the day, the plaza hustles with schoolchildren, shoppers, and tourists.  After the sun sets, there are often live bands giving concerts to "multigenerational families."

Venue
The square is the site of numerous cultural celebrations. Among these are Carnaval Ponceño, Las Mañanitas and Fiestas Patronales. Many musical events related to the Las Justas sporting event also take place here.

Gallery

References

External links

 Plaza Las Delicias video - featuring the Lions Fountain
 Information about Ponce's touristic places
 Photo of the fountain prior to the Lions Fountain Accessed 15 December 2010.
 West end of Plaza Muñoz Rivera c. early 1900s The famed Armstrong-Poventud Residence is visible on the right. Accessed 5 January 2011.
 Plaza Muñoz Rivera circa early 1900s looking southeast. Ponce Cathedral is on the left, and Parque de Bombas, barely visible is further in the background also on the left. Accessed 5 January 2011.
 Plaza Muñoz Rivera before 1917. The location of the statue of Luis Munoz Rivera, erected on this plaza in 1923, was still being occupied by lamp posts when this photo was taken. Accessed 5 January 2011.
 Plaza Degetau in the 1940s with Blind Justice Statue pictured. Retrieved 5 January 2011.
Arab kiosk at Plaza Las Delicias. Arab kiosk at Plaza Las Delicias, now Plaza Muñoz Rivera in Plaza Las Delicias. Note the Cathedral in the right background with its pre-1918 towers, and the Parque de Bombas in the left background, at that time painted in light blue. Retrieved 8 January 2011.

Urban public parks
Parks in Ponce, Puerto Rico
Gardens in Puerto Rico
1670 establishments in Puerto Rico
Squares in Puerto Rico
Tourist attractions in Ponce, Puerto Rico
Barrio Segundo